Kathy Harrington (born December 24, 1958) is an American politician who has served in the North Carolina Senate from the 43rd district since 2011. She was elected Senate Majority Leader by her Republican colleagues following the 2020 elections - making her the first woman elected to that position.

Electoral history

2020

2018

2016

2014

2012

2010

2008

References

External links
 Kathy Harrington at votesmart.org
 Kathy Harrington at ballotpedia.org

|-

1958 births
21st-century American politicians
21st-century American women politicians
Living people
Republican Party North Carolina state senators
People from Gastonia, North Carolina
Women state legislators in North Carolina